Edward Lhuyd  (occasionally written Llwyd in line with modern Welsh orthography; 1660 – 30 June 1709) was a Welsh naturalist, botanist, linguist, geographer and antiquary. He is also named in a Latinate form as Eduardus Luidius.

Life
Lhuyd was born in 1660, in Loppington, Shropshire, England, the illegitimate son of Edward Lloyd of Llanforda, Oswestry, and Bridget Pryse of Llansantffraid, near Talybont, Cardiganshire in 1660. His family belonged to the gentry of south-west Wales. Though well-established, the family was not wealthy. His father experimented with agriculture and industry in a manner that impinged on the new science of the day. The son attended and later taught at Oswestry Grammar School and went up to Jesus College, Oxford in 1682, but dropped out before graduation. In 1684, he was appointed to assist Robert Plot, Keeper of the Ashmolean Museum (then in Broad Street), and replaced him as such in 1690, holding the post until his death in 1709.

While working at the Ashmolean, Lhuyd travelled extensively. A visit to Snowdonia in 1688 allowed him to compile for John Ray's Synopsis Methodica Stirpium Britannicorum a list of flora local to that region. After 1697, Lhuyd visited every county in Wales, then travelled to Scotland, Ireland, Cornwall, Brittany and the Isle of Man. In 1699, it became possible through funding from his friend Isaac Newton for him to publish the first catalogue ever of fossils: Lithophylacii Britannici Ichnographia. These had been collected in England, mostly in Oxford, and are now held in the Ashmolean.

Lhuyd received a MA honoris causa from the University of Oxford in 1701 and a fellowship of the Royal Society in 1708.

In 1696 Lluyd transcribed much of the Latin inscription on the 9th-century Pillar of Eliseg near Valle Crucis Abbey, Denbighshire. The inscription subsequently became almost illegible due to weathering, but Lhuyd's transcript seems to have been remarkably accurate.

Lhuyd was also responsible for the first scientific description and naming of what we would now recognize as a dinosaur: the sauropod tooth Rutellum impicatum (Delair and Sarjeant, 2002).

The first written record of a trilobite was by Lhuyd in a letter to Martin Lister in 1688 and published (1869) in his Lithophylacii Britannici Ichnographia. It is a fleeting mention, and he simply identifies his find as a "skeleton of some flat fish". The trilobite is nowadays identified as Ogygiocarella debuchii Brongniart, 1822.

Pioneering linguist
In the late 17th century, Lhuyd was contacted by a group of scholars led by John Keigwin of Mousehole, who sought to preserve and further the Cornish language. He accepted their invitation to travel there to study it. Early Modern Cornish was the subject of a paper published by Lhuyd in 1702; it differs from the medieval language in having a considerably simpler structure and grammar.

In 1707, having been assisted in his research by a fellow Welsh scholar, Moses Williams, Lhuyd published the first volume of Archaeologia Britannica: an Account of the Languages, Histories and Customs of Great Britain, from Travels through Wales, Cornwall, Bas-Bretagne, Ireland and Scotland. This has an important linguistic description of Cornish, noted all the more for the understanding of historical linguistics it shows. Some of the ideas commonly attributed to linguists of the 19th century have their roots in this work by Lhuyd, who was "considerably more sophisticated in his methods and perceptions than [Sir William] Jones".

Lhuyd noted a similarity between two linguistic families: Brythonic or P–Celtic (Breton, Cornish and Welsh) and Goidelic or Q–Celtic (Irish, Manx and Scottish Gaelic). He argued that the Brythonic originated in Gaul (France) and the Goidelic in the Iberian Peninsula. He concluded that as the languages were of Celtic origin, those who spoke them were Celts. From the 18th century, peoples of Brittany, Cornwall, Ireland, Isle of Man, Scotland and Wales were known increasingly as Celts. They are seen to this day as modern Celtic nations.

Death and legacy
On his travels, Lhuyd developed asthma, which eventually led to his death from pleurisy in Oxford in 1709. He died in his room in the Ashmolean Museum aged just 49 and was buried in the Welsh aisle of the church of St Michael at the Northgate.

The Snowdon lily (Gagea serotina) was for a time called Lloydia serotina after Lhuyd. Cymdeithas Edward Llwyd, the National Naturalists' Society of Wales, is named after him. On 9 June 2001 a bronze bust of him was unveiled by Dafydd Wigley, a former Plaid Cymru leader, outside the University of Wales Centre for Advanced Welsh and Celtic Studies in Aberystwyth, next to the National Library of Wales. The sculptor was John Meirion Morris; the inscription on the plinth, carved by Ieuan Rees, reads "" ("linguist, antiquary, naturalist").

References

Works

Further reading

External links

Archaeologia Britannica (1707). Downloadable pdf at The Internet Archive
Biography of Edward Lhuyd from the Canolfan Edward Llwyd, a centre for the study of science through Welsh
Lithophylacii Britannici ichnographia (1699) – full digital facsimile from Linda Hall Library

1660 births
1709 deaths
Scientists from Shropshire
People educated at Oswestry School
Alumni of Jesus College, Oxford
Celtic studies scholars
Welsh botanists
Pre-Linnaean botanists
Welsh curators
Fellows of the Royal Society
People associated with the Ashmolean Museum
Language comparison
Cornish language
17th-century Welsh scientists
Welsh antiquarians
17th-century antiquarians
18th-century antiquarians
Linguists from Wales
Welsh geographers